The 1908 Philadelphia Phillies season was a season in Major League Baseball. The Phillies finished fourth in the National League with a record of 83 wins and 71 losses.

Preseason 
The Phillies' 1908 spring training was held in Savannah, Georgia where the team stayed at the Hotel DeSoto and practiced and played exhibition games at Bolton Street Park.

Entertainer George "Honey Boy" Evans spent two weeks in March 1908 with the Phillies at spring training where he stayed and practiced with the team and socialized with the players. The Phillies named their team of younger players the "Honey Boys" in intrasquad games against the regulars in honor of Evans.

1908 Philadelphia City Series
The Phillies played four games against the Philadelphia Athletics for the local championship in the pre-season city series. The Athletics defeated the Phillies 3 games to 1.

The Phillies record against the A's was 20–21 all time after the 1908 series.

Regular season

Season standings

Record vs. opponents

Roster

Player stats

Batting

Starters by position 
Note: Pos = Position; G = Games played; AB = At bats; H = Hits; Avg. = Batting average; HR = Home runs; RBI = Runs batted in

Other batters 
Note: G = Games played; AB = At bats; H = Hits; Avg. = Batting average; HR = Home runs; RBI = Runs batted in

Pitching

Starting pitchers 
Note: G = Games pitched; IP = Innings pitched; W = Wins; L = Losses; ERA = Earned run average; SO = Strikeouts

Other pitchers 
Note: G = Games pitched; IP = Innings pitched; W = Wins; L = Losses; ERA = Earned run average; SO = Strikeouts

Relief pitchers 
Note: G = Games pitched; W = Wins; L = Losses; SV = Saves; ERA = Earned run average; SO = Strikeouts

References 

1908 Philadelphia Phillies season at Baseball Reference

Philadelphia Phillies seasons
Philadelphia Phillies season
Philly